"Not Falling" is the first single from American band Mudvayne's second full-length studio album, The End of All Things to Come. It was Mudvayne's most commercially successful single chart-wise until "Happy? in 2005.

The song got renewed attention when during the band's 2022 reunion tour in Tampa, Gray fell off the stage while performing the song. Gray himself noted the irony, and joked it was "amazing".

Music and lyrics 
"Not Falling" talks about being self-strong and not giving up. The song begins and concludes with heavier segments and screamed vocals, while its middle section is more atmospheric and melodic.

Music videos
The song has three music videos: two official and one unofficial. The first video depicts the band being transformed into veiny creatures with white, egg-colored bug eyes and performing the song in a dark chamber. Additionally featured are images of parasites traveling through someone's bloodstream.  The second video, directed by Dean Karr, features the members performing the song in a blizzard, notably without the costumes. The unofficial third music video appears on the DVD for the 2002 horror film Ghost Ship, in which the song was featured heavily. The video consists of a montage of clips from the film with the song played over.

Track listing
Promo single

7" vinyl single

Video single

In popular culture
 It is  featured in the 2002 film Ghost Ship.
 It can be heard temporarily during the first episode of Fur TV. Other Mudvayne songs such as "Dig" and "Determined" are also heard in the episode.

Charts

References

External links
 Video 1
 Video 2

2002 singles
Mudvayne songs
Songs written by Chad Gray
Songs written by Ryan Martinie
Songs written by Matthew McDonough
Songs written by Greg Tribbett
Song recordings produced by David Bottrill
2002 songs
Epic Records singles